The 2019–20 season is Pistoia Basket's 20th in existence and the club's 8th consecutive season in the top flight of Italian basketball.

Overview 
The 2019-20 season was hit by the coronavirus pandemic that compelled the federation to suspend and later cancel the competition without assigning the title to anyone. Pistoia ended the championship in 15th position.

The management did not renew the participation to the Serie A for the season 2020-21 and the team was demoted to the Serie A2.

Kit 
Supplier: Erreà / Sponsor: Oriora

Players

Current roster

Depth chart

Squad changes

In

|}

Out

|}

Confirmed 

|}

Coach

Competitions

Serie A

References 

2019–20 in Italian basketball by club